John Osogo (John Nikola Bwire Osogo; 1 January 1927 — 9 December 1979) was Kenyan educationist and historian.

Represents Luhya minority.

Biography 

Was born in 1927 at Port Victoria, Bukani Village, Busia District in western Kenya.

After completion his primary and secondary schools in record time, he worked as a tutor in a teacher training college before moving to Kenya Institute of Education, later he succeeded to receive scholarships in order to attend universities in Kenya, Uganda, the UK and USA.

John Osogo devoted his life to investigation of Kenyan society and history of Kenyan people, particularly his own Luhya community.

Died in 1979.

Bibliography 

 Looking at East Africa: The Nineteenth Century, 1965
 Life in Kenya in the Olden Days : The Baluyia . (Nairobi : Oxford University Press), 1965
 A history of the Baluyia, 1966
 The bride who wanted a special present, and other tales from western Kenya, 1966
 A Traditional History of Kenya: Teacher's Handbook. (Longmans of Kenya), 1968
 The bride who wanted a special present, and other tales from western Kenya, 1969
 Kenya's peoples in the past : pupils' book for standard three, 1973
 Bi arusi aliyetaka zawadi maalum : na hadithi nyingine kutoka Magharibi ya Kenya, 1976
 East Africa's peoples in the past, 1977

Recognition 

In honor of John Osogo were names primary and secondary schools in his home village; his name bears also estate road in Nairobi.  

In 2018 JNB Osogo Foundation was established.

References 

Kenyan educators
Kenyan historians
Luhya people
1927 births
1979 deaths